Allanpringite is a phosphate mineral named after Australian mineralogist Allan Pring of the South Australian Museum. Allanpringite is a Fe3+ analogue Al-phosphate mineral wavellite, but it has a different crystal symmetry – monoclinic instead of orthorhombic in wavellite. It forms needle-like crystals, which are always twinned and form parallel bundles up to about 2 mm long. They are often found in association with other iron phosphates in abandoned iron mines.

References

Phosphate minerals
Monoclinic minerals
Minerals in space group 14